Hebei is a town under the administration of Luobei County, Heilongjiang, China. , it has five residential neighborhoods and the following ten villages under its administration:
Fendou Village
Shuangsheng Village
Jiulizhuang Village
Senshan Village
Xinhe Village
Changsheng Village
Zhenxing Village
Jinshan Village
Yunshanhe Village
Sanshuang Village

References 

Township-level divisions of Heilongjiang
Luobei County